Rebecca Jayne Romero, MBE (born 24 January 1980) is an English sportswoman, a former World Champion and Olympic Games silver medallist at rowing, and a former World champion and an Olympic champion track cyclist.

Early life and education
Romero was born in Carshalton, London, of an English mother and Spanish father, and brought up in Wallington, London where she attended Wallington High School for Girls. Her success in rowing and cycling has meant that she was funded as a full-time athlete since graduating from university.

Rowing
Romero has won world championships in both cycling and rowing; as a rower, she won a silver medal at the Athens 2004 Olympics in the quadruple sculls, and the following year was part of the British crew that won the 2005 World Championships in the quad sculls. 
Suffering from a persistent back injury, Romero retired from rowing in 2006.

Cycling
Romero later took up track cycling, and made rapid progress in her new sport, specialising in track endurance events.

In December 2006, Romero won a silver medal in the pursuit at the UCI Track World Cup event in Moscow – her international cycling debut – losing out to fellow Briton Wendy Houvenaghel.

Romero won her first Cycling World Championships medal in March 2007 with silver in the 3 km pursuit. The following year, at the 2008 UCI Track Cycling World Championships, held in Manchester, she won the individual and, (with Houvenaghel and Joanna Rowsell), team pursuit events.

Beijing Olympics
She became the first British woman ever to compete in two different sports at the Olympic Games when she rode in the individual pursuit in Beijing. In winning the gold, she also became only the second woman of any country (after Roswitha Krause of East Germany) to win a medal in two different sports at Summer Games.

Romero appeared nude on her bicycle in an advert for Powerade sports drink in the run up to the 2008 Summer Olympics.

Romero was appointed Member of the Order of the British Empire (MBE) in the 2009 New Year Honours.

Post-Beijing
Romero was expected to return to track cycling in October 2009 but did not return amid speculation that the individual pursuit would be dropped from the Olympic programme. It was announced in December 2009 that the event was to be dropped, meaning Romero was unable to defend her title at the 2012 Summer Olympics. She condemned the decision to drop the event as "ludicrous" but seemed set to make a further change of events by switching to the road time trial.

In August 2009 she attempted the 874-mile non-stop mixed tandem bicycle record attempt from Land's End to John O'Groats with James Cracknell but had to give up at more than half way due to a knee injury.

She planned to race in a time trial at Levens, Cumbria on 13 August 2011. She also raced in the British Time Trial Championships on 4 September 2011 finishing 4th overall.

In October 2011 Romero announced that she was withdrawing from British Cycling's Olympic Programme and that she would not be competing in the 2012 Olympics. She subsequently confirmed that she would compete in the Ironman 70.3 triathlon in Mallorca and the Ironman UK event in Bolton in 2012 and the 2012 Ironman World Championship.

Romero has set up Romero Performance, a sports performance consultancy organisation, which launched in January 2013.

Achievements

Rowing

Olympic Games
2004 –  Silver, Quadruple sculls (with Frances Houghton, Debbie Flood, Alison Mowbray)
World Championships
2001 – 5th, Quadruple sculls
2002 – 5th, Quadruple sculls
2003 – 4th, Double sculls
2005 – Gold, Quadruple sculls (with Katherine Grainger, Frances Houghton, Sarah Winkless)
U23 World Championships
1999 – 4th, Single sculls
2000 – Gold, Coxless pairs

Cycling

 Time Trial Champion (Cycling) 2006
UCI Track World Cups: 2 Silver Medals (Moscow & Manchester)
2007 World Championships – Silver, 3 km Pursuit
 National 3 km Pursuit Champion (Cycling) 2007
2007–08 UCI Track Cycling World Cup Classics: Gold individual pursuit Copenhagen
2008 World Championships – Gold, 3 km Pursuit
2008 World Championships – Gold, Team Pursuit
2008 Summer Olympics  Gold, Individual Pursuit

 4th British National Time Trial Championships (Cycling) 2011

See also 
Leander Club (member)

References

External links
 
 
 Profile on British Cycling

English people of Spanish descent
Cyclists at the 2008 Summer Olympics
English female rowers
English Olympic medallists
Olympic cyclists of Great Britain
Olympic rowers of Great Britain
Olympic gold medallists for Great Britain
Olympic silver medallists for Great Britain
Rowers at the 2004 Summer Olympics
1980 births
Living people
Members of the Order of the British Empire
Olympic medalists in cycling
Olympic medalists in rowing
Alumni of the University of Surrey
People educated at Wallington High School for Girls
Alumni of St Mary's University, Twickenham
English female cyclists
People from Carshalton
UCI Track Cycling World Champions (women)
Medalists at the 2008 Summer Olympics
Members of Leander Club
Medalists at the 2004 Summer Olympics
World Rowing Championships medalists for Great Britain
English track cyclists
Alumni of Richmond upon Thames College